This is a list of 131 species in the genus Rhodobaenus.

Rhodobaenus species

References